Sacrifice is a 2020 horror film. Based on the short story "Men of the Cloth" by Paul Kane, the film is a Lovecraftian horror.

Plot 
Americans Isaac and his pregnant wife Emma go to a Norwegian island to claim a house he has inherited. They meet a pagan cult who worship a sea deity, and events turn sinister.

Cast

Release 
The film premiered at the 2020 London FrightFest Film Festival. It was later released as video on demand on 9 February 2021 and on Blu-ray on 23 February 2021.

Reception 
The review aggregator website Rotten Tomatoes surveyed  and, categorizing the reviews as positive or negative, assessed 10 as positive and five as negative for  rating. The Guardian gave the film 3/5 stars and said it had "a 1970s giallo vibe."

References

External links 
 
 

2020 films
2020 horror films
British horror films
2020 independent films
British independent films
2020s English-language films
2020s British films